#DRCL midnight children is a Japanese manga series written and illustrated by Shin-ichi Sakamoto. It is based on Bram Stoker's novel Dracula. It is being serialized monthly in Shueisha's Grand Jump, with its chapters has been collected into two tankōbon volumes as of October 2022. #DRCL midnight children is a story set in 19th Century Britain that goes beyond gender, borders, and social status, following Mina Murray and her colleagues as they attempt to obtain victory against a foe from a far away land in the East.

Characters
 Mina Murray a ginger tomboy from Lancashire. She is adept at Catch as Can Catch wrestling , however Mina is the only girl in her school and is bullied by her male classmates for her academic and physical prowess.
 Luke / Lucy Westenra an aloof and frail young man. At night he turns into Lucy who is best friends with Mina, however during the day he shows indifference to Mina.
 Arthur Holmwood the leader of his group of friends, he is from nobility and views himself as a gallant knight but is secretly a coward. He is notably kinder to Mina than the other boys.
 Joe Suwa a Japanese photographer who helps in tormenting Mina. He is quite mysterious and the disturbed nun Renfield lives with him.
 Quincey Morris an African American from Texas. He is the main instigator in bullying Mina and has a loud and abrasive personality.

Publication
#DRCL midnight children, written and illustrated by Shin-ichi Sakamoto, is based on Bram Stoker's novel Dracula. The series was first published with a preview chapter in Shueisha's seinen manga magazine Grand Jump on December 2, 2020; it began its serialization in the magazine on January 20, 2021. Shueisha released the first tankōbon volume on February 18, 2022. As of October 19, 2022, two volumes have been released.

On February 3, 2023, Viz Media licensed the manga for English publication.

Volume list

References

External links
  
 

Comics based on Dracula
Seinen manga
Shueisha manga
Vampires in anime and manga
Viz Media manga